Craugastor charadra is a species of frogs in the family Craugastoridae.

It is found in Guatemala and Honduras.
Its natural habitats are subtropical or tropical moist lowland forests, subtropical or tropical moist montane forests, rivers, and plantations .
It is threatened by habitat loss.

Sources

charadra
Amphibians described in 2000
Amphibians of Guatemala
Taxonomy articles created by Polbot